The 1903–04 season was Stoke's 15th season in the Football League.

Any hopes Stoke fans had that last season's achievement of finishing sixth would signal a change in the club's fortunes were short-lived as the 1903–04 season was another poor one for Stoke. The team was in a hard relegation battle again and for the third time in four seasons Stoke required a final day escape and again they survived. Stoke drew the final match  1–1 with Derby County giving Stoke one more point than relegated Liverpool.

Season review

League
Off the pitch, Stoke's financial problems continued after spending £2000 on a roof for the Butler Street Stand meaning that the season's budget was spent before a ball was kicked. Stoke did receive some support from the church who agreed to provide a 21-year lease on the Victoria Ground enabling Stoke to continue improving their ground. Hopes for similar improvements on the pitch however were short-lived as the 1903–04 season was another poor one for Stoke and their supporters. The team were in deep relegation trouble from Christmas onwards. Arthur Lockett such a key figure in the side last season signed for Aston Villa, and although one or two other players were drafted in few looked to have any real class. Stoke's best signing was that of Fred Rouse from Grimsby Town who would eventually be sold for a profit.

By January 1904 Mart Watkins had followed Lockett to Villa and at Easter time there was certainly an element of déjà vu about the position the club were in. West Bromwich Albion were sitting bottom of the table with 21 points from 30 games whilst Stoke were above them with the same number of points and matches played, while Liverpool had 22 points and Derby 23. Again it all came down to the final match of the season and yet again Stoke survived, a point against Derby was enough to keep Stoke up.

FA Cup
Stoke lost 3–2 at home to Aston Villa in the first round in front of 15,000 spectators with Stoke's goals coming from George Baddeley and Sam Higginson.

Final league table

Results
Stoke's score comes first

Legend

Football League First Division

FA Cup

Squad statistics

References

Stoke City F.C. seasons
Stoke F.C.